Gentiloni is an Italian surname. Notable people with the surname include:

Paolo Gentiloni (born 1954), Italian Prime Minister
 Vincenzo Ottorino Gentiloni (1865–1916), Italian politician, known for the
Gentiloni pact, 1913 Italian political deal

Italian-language surnames